Darmandek (also Romanized as Darmāndek; also known as Darmānderīk and Dīlmānderīk) is a village in Chahriq Rural District, Kuhsar District, Salmas County, West Azerbaijan Province, Iran. At the 2006 census, its population was 103, in 16 families.

References 

Populated places in Salmas County